The 2017 Detroit mayoral election was held on November 7, 2017, to elect the Mayor of Detroit, Michigan. It was the first mayoral election for the city since it emerged from state control under Michigan's emergency manager law. Incumbent Mike Duggan won re-election to a second term.

The Mayor of Detroit is elected on a non-partisan basis, where the candidates are not listed by political party. A non-partisan primary election was held on August 8, 2017. The top two finishers advanced to the general election on November 7, 2017. As of August 2017, half of the remaining eight candidates are ex-felons.

Candidates

Declared
Articia M. Bomer, document specialist
Edward Dean, youth mentor
Mike Duggan, incumbent Mayor
Curtis Christopher Greene, author, activist, and minister
Donna Marie Pitts
Danetta L. Simpson
Coleman Young II, State Senator and son of former Detroit Mayor Coleman A. Young
Ken Snapp, student, mentor and activist (youngest candidate)
Ingrid LaFleur, write-in candidate, Afrofuturist
William Noakes, write-in candidate, attorney, preacher, business executive, professor
Myya Jones, write-in candidate; 22 year old Michigan State University graduate

Withdrawn
Anita Belle, President of the Reparations Labor Union, substitute teacher, and political activist
Angelo S. Brown (did not file enough valid petition signatures)
Jeffrey Robinson, principal and pastor
Brenda K. Sanders, former judge and candidate for mayor in 2009
Eric Williams, lawyer

Declined
Benny N. Napoleon, Wayne County Sheriff and candidate for mayor of Detroit in 2013

Results

Mayoral primary election, August 8

Mayoral general election, November 7

References

External links
Duggan for Detroit
LaFleur For Mayor
Noakes For Mayor

2017
Detroit
Detroit
Detroit
mayoral election